Frank Farmer may refer to:

 Frank Farmer (racing driver) (1900–1932), American racecar driver
 Frank Farmer (physicist) (1912–2004), British medical physicist
 Frank Farmer (writer) (1924–2014), American author and writer
 F. R. Farmer (Frank Reginald Farmer, 1914–2001), British nuclear safety regulator
 Frank Farmer, the title character of the 1992 film The Bodyguard